Class P: Language and Literature is a classification used by the Library of Congress Classification system. This page outlines the subclasses of Class P. It contains 19 sub-classifications, 12 of which are dedicated to language families and geographic groups of languages, and 10 sub-classifications of literature (4 subclasses contain both languages and literatures).

P - Philology; Linguistics

1-1091..........Philology. Linguistics
1-85...........General
29............Encyclopedias and dictionaries of linguistics
37............Psycholinguistics
40............Sociolinguistics
61-77.........History of linguistics
87-96..........Communication. Mass media
94.7..........Interpersonal communication
95-95.6.......Oral communication. Speech
98-98.5........Computational linguistics. Natural language processing
99-99.4........Semiotics
99.5-99.6......Nonverbal communication
101-410........Language. Linguistic theory
106...........Philosophy of language
107...........Language and socio-psychological identity
116...........Origins and evolution of language
117...........Gesture
118-118.7.....Language acquisition
118..........First language acquisition
118.2........Second language acquisition
121-299.......Science of language (Linguistics)
121..........General language science textbooks
126..........Empirical research methods in linguistics
132..........Biological foundations of language
140-142......Historical linguistics
151-158.2....Grammar. Syntax
165..........Cognitive linguistics
211..........Historical writing systems
216-233......Phonology. Phonetics
216.........General phonology and phonetics
217-217.6...Phonology
221-221.5...Phonetics
222.........Intonation
241..........Morphology
291..........Generative grammar
301-301.5.....Style. Composition. Rhetoric, Figurative language
302-302.87....Discourse analysis
306-310.......Translating and interpreting
321-324.5.....Etymology
325-325.5.....Semantics
326-326.5.....Lexicology
327-327.5.....Lexicography
375-381.......Linguistic geography
501-769........Indo-European (Indo-Germanic) philology
901-1091.......Extinct ancient or medieval languages

PA - Greek and Latin languages and literature

1-199...........Classical philology
201-899.........Greek philology and language
1000-1179.......Medieval and modern Greek language
2001-2915.......Latin philology and language
3000-3049.......Classical literature
3050-4505.......Greek literature
3051-3285......Literary history
3300-3516......Collections
3520-3564......Criticism, interpretations, etc.
3601-3681......Translations
3818-4505......Individual authors
3825-3849.....Aeschylus
3851-3858.....Aesop
3875-3879.....Aristophanes
3890-3926.....Aristotle
3949-3964.....Demosthenes
3973-3992.....Euripides
4018-4209.....Homer
4279-4333.....Plato
4367-4389.....Plutarch
4413-4434.....Sophocles
4452-4486.....Thucydides
4494-4499.....Xenophon
5000-5660.......Byzantine and modern Greek literature
5301-5637......Individual authors
6000-6971.......Roman literature
6001-6097......Literary history
6100-6140......Collections
6141-6144......Criticism, interpretation, etc.
6155-6191......Translations
6202-6971......Individual authors
6235-6269.....Caesar, C. Julius
6278-6370.....Cicero
6393-6444.....Horatius
6482-6496.....Lucretius
6501-6510.....Martialis
6519-6553.....Ovidius Naso
6568-6609.....Plautus
6611-6637.....Plinius
6661-6693.....Seneca, Lucius Annaeus
6705-6753.....Tacitus
6755-6785.....Terence
6801-6961.....Virgil
8001-8595.......Medieval and modern Latin literature
8200-8595......Individual authors

PB - Modern languages; Celtic languages

1-3029............Modern languages; Celtic languages
1-431............General
1001-3029........Celtic languages and literature
1101-1200.......Goidelic; Gaelic
1201-1449.......Irish
1501-1709.......Gaelic (Scottish Gaelic, Erse)
1801-1867.......Manx
1950............Pict
2001-3029.......Brittanic group
2101-2499......Welsh; Cymric
2501-2621......Cornish
2801-2932......Breton; Armorican
3001-3029......Gaulish

PC - Romance languages

1–5498...........Romanic
1–400...........General
601–872.........Romanian
901–986.........Raeto-Romance (including Romansh)
1001–1977.......Italian
1981–1984.......Sardinian
2001–3761.......French
2700–3708......Dialects. Provincialisms
2813–2898.....Old French
3201–3366.....Provencal (Old)
3371–3420.5...Modern patois of South France
3420.8–3495...Langue d'oc dialects
3721–3761......Slang. Argot
3801–3976.......Catalan
4001–4977.......Spanish
5001–5498.......Portuguese

PD - Germanic languages; Scandinavian languages

1-7159........Germanic
1-777........General
1001-1350....Old Germanic Dialects
1101-1211...Gothic
1501-7159....North Germanic, Scandinavian
2201-2392...Old Norse. Old Icelandic and Old Norwegian
2401-2489....Modern Icelandic
2483-2489...Old Norse dialects
2501-2999....Norwegian
3001-3929....Danish
5001-5929....Swedish
6000-7159....Scandinavian dialects, Modern

PE - English language

1–3729........English
101–458......Anglo-Saxon. Old English
501–693......Middle English
814–896......Early Modern English
1001–1693....Modern English
1700–3602....Dialects. Provincialisms, etc.
3701–3729....Slang. Argot, etc.

PF - West Germanic languages

1–5999.........West Germanic
1–979.........Dutch
1001–1184.....Flemish
1401–1541.....Frisian
3001–5999.....German
3801–3991....Old High German
3992–4010....Old Saxon
4043–4350....Middle High German
4501–4596....Early Modern German
5000–5951....Dialects. Provincialism, etc.
5971–5999....Slang. Argot, etc.

PG - Slavic, Baltic, and Albanian languages

1-9665.............Slavic. Baltic. Albanian
1-7948............Slavic
1-499............Slavic philology and languages (General)
500-585..........Slavic literature (General)
601-716..........Church Slavic
771-799..........Bulgarian Church Slavic
801-1146.........Bulgarian
1151-1199........Macedonian
1201-1696........Serbo-Croatian
1801-1962........Slovenian
2001-2826........Russian language
2830-2847........Belarusian
2900-3698........Russian literature
2900-3190.......History and criticism
2900-2998......General
3001-3026......Special periods
3041-3065......Poetry
3071-3089......Drama
3091-3099......Prose
3100-3155......Folk literature (including texts)
3199-3299.......Collections
3199-3205......General
3211-3219......Translations
3223-3228......Special periods
3230-3238......Poetry
3240-3255......Drama
3260-3299......Prose
3300-3490.......Individual authors and works
3300-3308......Early to 1700
3310-3319......18th century
3312..........Derzhavin
3314..........Karamzin
3316..........Lomonosov
3318..........Sumarokov
3320-3447......1800-1870
3325-3328.....Dostoevskii
3332-3335.....Gogol
3340-3359.....Pushkin
3365-3417.....Tolstoi
3420-3445.....Turgenev
3450-3470......1870-1917
3452..........Andreev
3455-3458.....Gor'kii
3475-3476......1917-1960
3477-3490......1961-2000
3491.2-3493.96....2001-
3500-3505.......Provincial, local, etc.
3515-3550.......Outside the Russian Federation
3651-3698.......Special subjects
3801-3987........Ukrainian
3990.............Carpatho-Rusyn
4001-5146........Czech
5201-5546........Slovak
5631-5689........Sorbian (Wendic)
6001-7446........Polish
7900-7925........Other Slavic dialects
8001-9146.........Baltic
8201-8208........Old Prussian
8501-8772........Lithuanian
8801-9146........Latvian
9501-9665.........Albanian

PH - Uralic languages and Basque

1-5490.............Uralic. Basque
1-87..............General
91-98.5...........Finnic. Baltic-Finnic
101-405...........Finnish
501-1109..........Other Finnic languages and dialects
501-509..........Karelian
521-529..........Olonets
531-539..........Ludic
541-549..........Veps
551-559..........Ingrian
561-569..........Vitic
581-589..........Livonian
601-671..........Estonian
701-735..........Lapp, [now Sami languages group]
751-785..........Mordvin
801-836..........Mari
1001-1079........Permian, [a.k.a. Komi-Permyak]
1101-1109........Udmurt  1201-1409....Ugric languages
2001-3445.........Hungarian
3801-3820.........Samoyedic languages
5001-5490.........Basque

PJ - Oriental languages and literature

1-9500..........Oriental philology and literature
1-489..........General
1-195.........Languages
306-489.......Literature
601-995........Special groups
601-621.......Christian Oriental
701-989.......Mohammedan
991-995.......Hamito-Semitic
1001-1989......Egyptology
1091-1109.....Egyptian writing and its decipherment
1111-1439.....Language
1481-1989.....Literature. Inscriptions
2001-2199......Coptic
2340-2399......Lybyco-Berber languages. Berber languages
2353-2367.....Libyan group
2369-2399.....Berber languages
2401-2594......Cushitic languages
3001-3097......Semitic philology and literature
3101-4091......East Semitic languages
3101-3971.....Assyriology. Akkadian
3231-3595....Language
3601-3971....Literature. Inscriptions
4001-4091.....Sumerian
4101-4197......West and North Semitic languages
4171-4197.....Phenician-Punic
4501-5192......Hebrew
4543-4937.....Language (Biblical and modern)
4951-5000.....Medieval Hebrew
5001-5060.....Literature
5050-5060....Individual authors and works
5061-5192.....Other languages used by the Jews
5111-5192....Yiddish
5201-5329......Aramaic
5211-5289.....West Aramaic
5211-5219....Biblical (Chaldaic)
5229.........Palmyrene inscriptions
5239.........Nabataean inscriptions
5241-5249....Christian Palestinian
5251-5259....Jewish Palestinian
5271-5279....Samaritan
5281-5289....Neo-Aramaic
5301-5329.....East Aramaic
5321-5329....Mandaean
5401-5909......Syriac
5414-5493.....Language
5601-5695.....Literature
5701-5709.....East Syriac (Nestorian)
5711-5719.....West Syriac (Jacobite)
5801-5809.....Neo-Syriac dialects (Modern Syriac)
5901-5909.....South Semitic languages
6001-8517......Arabic
6073-7144.....Language
6690-6697....Ancient Arabic
6701-6901....Modern Arabic dialects
6950-7144....South Arabian
6950-6981...Ancient
7051-7144...Modern
7501-8517.....Literature
7695.8-7876..Individual authors or works
8991-9293......Ethiopian languages
9001-9101.....Ethiopic (Geez)
9201-9269.....Amharic

PK - Indo-Iranian languages and literature

1-9601...................Indo-Iranian philology and literature
1-85....................General
101-2899................Indo-Aryan languages
101-185................General
(201)-379..............Vedic
401-976................Sanskrit
1001-1095..............Pali
1201-1409.5............Prakrit
1421-1429.5............Apabhraṃśa
1471-1490..............Middle Indo-Aryan dialects
1501-2899..............Modern Indo-Aryan languages
1550-2899.............Particular languages and dialects
1550-1569............Assamese
1651-(1799)..........Bengali
1801-1831.95.........Bihari
1841-1870.95.........Gujarati
1931-2212............Hindi, Urdu, Hindustani languages and literatures
1931-1970...........Hindi language
1971-1979.5.........Urdu language
1981-2000...........Hindustani language
2030-2142...........Hindi, Hindustani literatures
2151-2212...........Urdu literature
2261-2270.9..........Lahnda
2351-2418............Marathi
2461-2479............Marwari
2561-2579.5..........Oriya
2591-2610............Pahari
2631-2659............Panjabi
2701-2708.9..........Rajasthani
2781-2790............Sindhi
2801-2891............Sinhalese (Singhalese)
2892-2892.95.........Siraki
2896-2899............Romani
(2901)-5471.............Indo-Aryan literature
(2901)-2979............General
3591-4485..............Sanskrit
3791-3799.............Individual authors and works
(3801)-(4251).........Special subjects
4471-4485.............Translations
(4501)-4681............Pali literature
4990-5046..............Prakrit literature
5401-5471..............Modern Indo-Aryan literature
6001-6996...............Iranian philology and literature
6001-6099..............General
6101-(6119)............Avestan
6121-6129..............Old Persian
6135-6199.9............Middle Iranian languages
6141-6199.5...........Pahlavi
6201-(6599.7)..........New Persian
6201-6399.............Language
6400-(6599.7).........Literature
6450.9-6562.35.......Individual authors or works
6455-6460...........Firdawsi
6465................Hafiz
6475................Ibn Yamin, Fakhr al-Din Mahmud
6478-6482...........Jalal al-Din Rumi Maulana
6490................Jami
6501................Nizami Ganjavi
6510-6525...........Omar Khayyam
6540-6546...........Sadi
6701-6821..............Afghan (Pashto, Pushto, Pushtu, etc.)
7001-7075...............Dardic (Pisacha)
7021-7037..............Kashmiri
7040-7045..............Kohistani
7050-7065..............Nuristani (Kafiri) group
8001-8832...............Armenian language
8001-8496..............Language
8501-8832..............Armenian literature
9001-9201...............Caucasian languages
9101-9169..............Georgian

PL - Languages and literature of Eastern Asia, Africa, Oceania

1–8844.................Languages of Eastern Asia, Africa, Oceania
1–481.................Ural–Altaic languages
21–396...............Turkic languages
400–431..............Mongolian languages
450–481..............Tungus Manchu languages
(490)–495.............Far Eastern languages and literature
501–889...............Japanese language and literature
501–699..............Japanese language
700–889..............Japanese literature
700–751.5............History and criticism
752–783..............Collections
784–866..............Individual authors and works
885–889..............Local literature
901–998...............Korean language and literature
901–949..............Korean language
950–998..............Korean literature
950.2–969.5.........History and criticism
969.8–985...........Collections
986–993.............Individual authors and works
997–998.............Local literature
1001–3208.............Chinese language and literature
1001–1960............Chinese language
2250–3208............Chinese literature
2250–2443...........History and criticism
2450–2659...........Collections
2661–2979...........Individual authors and works
3030–3208...........Provincial, local, colonial, etc.
3301–3311.............Non-Chinese languages of China
3501–3509.............Non-Aryan languages of India and Southeastern Asia in general
3512..................Malaysian literature
3515..................Singapore literature
3518..................Languages of the Montagnards
3521–4001.............Sino-Tibetan languages
3551–4001............Tibeto-Burman languages
3561–3801...........Tibeto-Himalayan languages
3601–3775..........Tibetan
3781–3801..........Himalayan languages
3851–4001...........Assam and Burma
4051–4054.............Karen languages
4070–4074.............Miao–Yao languages
4281–4587.............Austroasiatic languages
4301–4470............Mon–Khmer (Mon–Annam) languages
4371–4379...........Vietnamese. Annamese
4423–4470...........Bru, Chrau, Khasi, Muong, etc.
4471–4471.5..........Nicobarese
4490–4498............Chamic languages
4501–4587............Munda languages (Kolarian languages)
4601–(4890)...........Dravidian languages
5001–7511.............Languages of Oceania
5001–7101............Austronesian, Papuan, and Australian languages
5051–5497...........Malayan (Indonesian) languages
5501–6135...........Philippine languages
6145–6167...........Taiwan languages
6191–6341...........Micronesian and Melanesian languages
6401–6551...........Polynesian languages
6601–6621...........Papuan languages
7001–7101...........Australian languages
8000–8844.............African languages and literature
8000–8009............Languages
8009.5–8014..........Literature
8015–8021............Languages. By region or country
8024–8027............Special families of languages
8035–8844............Special languages (alphabetically)

PM - Hyperborean, Indian, and artificial languages

1-9021........Hyperborean, Native American, and artificial languages
1-94.........Hyperborean languages of Arctic Asia and America
101-2711.....American languages (Aboriginal)
231-355.....American languages of British North America
401-501.....American languages of the United States (and Mexico)
549-2711....Special languages of the United States and Canada (alphabetically)
3001-4566....Languages of Mexico and Central America
5001-7356....Languages of South America and the West Indies
7801-7895....Mixed languages
7831-7875...Creole languages
8001-8995....Artificial languages--Universal languages
8201-8298...Esperanto
8999.........Picture languages
9001-9021....Secret languages

PN - General literature

1-6790...............Literature (General)
1-9.................Periodicals
20-30...............Societies
45-57...............Theory.  Philosophy.  Esthetics
59-72...............Study and teaching
80-99...............Criticism
101-245.............Authorship
172-239............Technique.   Literary composition, etc.
241-241.5..........Translating as a literary pursuit
441-1009.5..........Literary history
451-497.............Biography
500-519.............Collections
597-605.............Special relations; movements; and currents of literature
610-779.............By Period
611-649............Ancient
661-694............Medieval (to 1500)
683-687...........Legends
688-691...........Poetry
692-693...........Prose;  Prose fiction
695-779............ Modern
715-749...........Renaissance (1500–1700)
801-820.............Romance literature
821-840.............Germanic literature
841.................Black literature (General)
842.................Jewish literature in various languages
851-(884)...........Comparative literature
(905)-1008..........Folk literature
980-995............Fables
1008.2-1009.5.......Juvenile literature.
1010-1525...........Poetry
1031-1049..........Theory, philosophy, relations, etc
1065-1085..........Relations to, and treatment of, special subjects
1110-1279..........History and criticism.
1301-1333..........Epic poetry
1341-1347..........Folk poetry
1351-1389..........Lyric poetry
1530...............The monologue
1551................The dialogue
1560-1590...........The performing arts;  Show business
1585-1589..........Centers for the performing arts
1600-3307...........Drama
1635-1650..........Relation to, and treatment of, special subjects
1660-1693..........Technique of dramatic composition
1720-1861..........History
1865-1988..........Special types
1990-1992.92.......Broadcasting
1991-1991.9.......Radio broadcasts
1992-1992.92......Television broadcasts
1992.93-1992.95...Nonbroadcast  video recordings
1993-1999..........Motion pictures
1997-1997.85......Plays, scenarios, etc.
2000-3307..........Dramatic representation;  The theater
2061-2071..........Art of acting
2085-2091..........The stage and accessories
2131-2193..........By period
2131-2145.........Ancient
2152-2160.........Medieval
2171-2179.........Renaissance
2181-2193.........Modern
2219.3-3030........Special regions or countries.
2920..............Japanese Theatre
3035...............The  Jewish theater
3151-3171..........Amateur theater
3175-3191..........College and school theatricals
3203-3299..........Tableaux, pageants, "Happenings," etc
3311-3503...........Prose;  Prose fiction
3329-3352..........Philosophy, theory, etc
3355-3383..........Technique;  Authorship
3427-3448..........Special kinds of fiction; Fiction genres
3451-3503..........History
4001-4355...........Oratory;  Elocution, etc
4071-4095..........Study and teaching
4177-4191..........Debating
4199-4191.........Recitations (in English)
4331-4335..........Recitations in foreign languages
4390................Diaries
4400................Letters (Literary history)
4500................Essays (Literary history)
4699-5650...........Journalism.  The periodical press, etc
4735-4748..........Relation to the state; Government and the press;  Liberty of the press
4775-4784..........Technique;  Practical journalism
4825-4830..........Amateur journalism
4832-4836..........Magazines and other periodicals
4840-5648..........By region or country
5650...............The Jewish press
6010-6790...........Collections of general literature
6066-6069..........Special classes of authors
6080-6095..........Quotations
6081-6084.........English
6086-6089.........French
6090-6110.........German
6099-6110..........Poetry
6110.5-6120........Drama
6120.15-6120.95....Fiction
6121-6129..........Orations
6130-6140..........Letters
6141-6145..........Essays
6146.5-6231........Wit and humor
6157-6222..........By region or country
6233-6238..........Anacreontic literature
6244-6246..........Literary extracts; Commonplace books
6249-6258..........Ana
6259-6268..........Anecdotes; Table talk
6269-6278..........Aphorisms; Apothegms
6279-6288..........Epigrams
6288.5-6298........Epitaphs
6299-6308..........Maxims
6309-6318..........Mottoes
6319-6328..........Sayings, bon mots, etc
6329-6338..........Thoughts
6340-6348..........Toasts
6348.5-6358........Emblems, devices
6361...............Paradoxes
6366-6377..........Riddles, acrostics, charades, conundrums, etc
6400-6525..........Proverbs
6700-6790..........Comic books,  strips, etc

PQ - French, Italian, Spanish, and Portuguese literature

1-3999...............French literature
1-771...............History and criticism
1-150..............General
151-221............Medieval. Old French
226-310............Modern
400-491............Poetry
500-591............Drama
601-771............Prose and prose fiction
(781)-841)..........Folk literature
845.................Juvenile literature
1100-1297...........Collections
1100-1145..........General
1160-1193..........Poetry
1211-1241..........Drama
1243-1297..........Prose
1300-1595...........Old French literature
1300-1391..........Collections. Individual authors and works
1411-1545.........To 1350/1400
1551-1595.........(14th-) 15th century (to ca. 1525)
1600-2726...........Modern literature. Individual authors
1600-1709..........16th century
1710-1935..........17th century
1947-2147..........18th century
2149-2551..........19th century
2600-2651..........1900-1960
2660-2686..........1961-2000
2700-2726..........2001-
3800-3999...........Provincial, local, colonial, etc.
4001-5999............Italian literature
4001-4199.5.........History and criticism
4001-4063..........General
4064-4075..........Early to 1500
4077-4088..........Modern
4091-(4131)........Poetry
4133-4160..........Drama
4161-4184..........Prose
(4186)-(4199)......Folk literature
4199.5.............Juvenile literature (General)
4201-4263...........Collections
4201-4204..........General
4205-4206..........Translations
4207-4225..........Poetry
4227-4245..........Drama
4247-4263..........Prose
4265-4556...........Individual authors and works to 1400
4561-4664...........Individual authors, 1400-1700
4675-4734...........Individual authors, 1701-1900
4800-4851...........Individual authors, 1900-1960
4860-4886...........Individual authors, 1961-2000
4900-4926...........Individual authors, 2001-
5901-5999...........Regional, provincial, local, etc.
6001-8929............Spanish literature
6001-6168...........History and criticism
6001-6056..........General
6056..............Moorish-Spanish literature
6058-6060..........Early to 1500
(6061)-6073........Modern
6075-6098..........Poetry
6098.7-6129........Drama
6131-6153..........Prose
(6155)-(6167)......Folk literature
6168...............Juvenile literature (General)
6170-6269...........Collections
6170-6174.9........General
6174.95-6215.......Poetry
6217-(6241)........Drama
6247-6264..........Prose
(6265)-6269........Translations
6271-6498...........Individual authors and works to 1700
6500-6576...........Individual authors, 1700-ca. 1868
6600-6647...........Individual authors, 1868-1960
6650-6676...........Individual authors, 1961-2000
6700-6726...........Individual authors, 2001-
7000-8929...........Provincial, local, colonial, etc.
7081-8560..........Spanish America
9000-9999............Portuguese literature
9000-9129...........History and criticism
9000-9034..........General
9035-9055..........Special periods
9061-9081..........Poetry
9083-9095..........Drama
9097-9119..........Prose
(9121)-(9128)......Folk literature
9129...............Juvenile literature (General)
9131-9188...........Collections
9131-9144..........General
9137..............Translations
9149-9163..........Poetry
9164-9170..........Drama
9172-9188..........Prose
9189................Individual authors and works to 1500
9191-9255...........Individual authors and works, 1500-1700
9261................Individual authors, 1701-1960
9262-9288...........Individual authors, 1961-2000
9300-9326...........Individual authors, 2001-
9400-9999...........Provincial, local, colonial, etc.

PR - English literature 

1-9680........English literature
1-56.........Literary history and criticism
57-78........Criticism
111-116......Women authors
125-138.5....Relations to other literatures and countries
161-479......By period
171-236.....Anglo-Saxon (Beginnings through 1066)
251-369.....Medieval. Middle English (1066-1500)
401-479.....Modern
421-429....Elizabethan era (1550-1640)
431-439....17th century
441-449....18th century
451-469....19th century
471-479....20th century
500-611......Poetry
521-611.....By period
621-739......Drama
641-739.....By period
750-885......Prose
767-808.....By period
821-885.....Prose fiction. The novel
901-907......Oratory
908..........Diaries
911-917......Letters
921-927......Essays
931-937......Wit and humor
951-981......Folk literature
1098-1369....Collections of English literature
1110........Special classes of authors
1119-1150...By period
1170-1227...Poetry
1241-1273...Drama
1281-1309...Prose (General)
1321-1329...Oratory
1330........Diaries
1341-1349...Letters
1361-1369...Essays
1490-1799....Anglo-Saxon literature
1803-2165....Anglo-Norman period. Early English. Middle English
2199-3195....English Renaissance (1500-1640)
2833........The Tempest
2838........The Two Gentlemen of Verona
3291-3785....17th and 18th centuries (1640-1770)
3991-5990....19th century, 1770/1800-1880/1900
6000-6049....1900-1960
6050-6076....1961-2000
6100-6126....2001-
8309-9680....English literature: Provincial local, etc.

PS - American literature

1-3626........American literature
126-138......Biography, memoirs, letters, etc.
147-152......Women authors
163-173......Treatment of special subjects, classes
185-228......By period
185-195.....17th/18th century
201-217.....19th century
221-228.....20th century
241-286......Special regions, states, etc
241-255.....North
261-267.....South
271-285.....West and Central
301-325......Poetry
330-352......Drama
360-379......Prose
370-379.....Prose fiction
400-408......Oratory
409..........Diaries
410-418......Letters
420-428......Essays
430-438......Wit and humor, satire
451-478......Folk literature
490..........Juvenile literature (general)
501-688......Collections of American literature
530-536.2...By period
537-574.....By region
538-549....North
551-559....South
561-572....West and Central
580-619.....Poetry
593........By form
601-615....By period
623-635.....Drama
642-659.5...Prose (general)
651-659....By period
660-668.....Oratory
666-668....By period
669.........Diaries
670-678.....Letters
680-688.....Essays
700-3576.....Individual authors
700-893.....17th/18th century (colonial period)
991-3390....19th century authors
3500-3549...Authors 1900-1960
3550-3576...Authors 1961-2000
3600-3626...Authors 2001-
8001-8649.....Canadian literature
8001-8039....General
8041-8057....Canadian literary criticism  (as a subject)
8061-8227....History and criticism of Canadian literature
8111-8117....By period
8129-8133 ...By region
8139-8227....Special forms
8139-8159....Poetry
8179-8199....Prose and prose fiction
8231-8379....Collections of Canadian literature
8400-8649....Individual authors

PT - Germanic literature

1-4897...........German literature
1-80............Literary history and criticism
83-(873)........History of German literature
175-230........Medieval
236-405........Modern
500-597........Poetry
605-709........Drama
711-871........Prose
(881)-(951)...Folk literature
923-937......Faust legend
1100-1479.......Collections
1100-1141......General
1151-1241......Poetry
1251-1299......Drama
1301-1360......Prose
1371-(1374)....Early to 1950. Old and Middle High German.
1375-1479......Middle High German
1501-2688.......Individual authors or works
1501-1695......Middle High German, ca. 1050-1450/1500
1701-1797......1500-ca. 1700
1799-2592......1700-ca. 1860/70
1891-2239......Goethe
1891-2017.....Works
2026-(2039)..Translations
(2044)-2239...Biography and criticism
2600-2653......1860/70-1960
2660-2688......1961-2000
2700-2728......2001-
3701-3971.......Provincial, local, colonial, etc.
3701-3746......East Germany
4801-4897.......Low German literature
5001-5980........Dutch literature
5001-5348.......Literary history and criticism
5001-5112......General
5121-5185......Special periods
5201-5243......Poetry
5250-5295......Drama
5300-5348......Prose
(5351)-5395.....Folk literature
5398............Juvenile literature (General)
5400-5547.......Collections
5400-5409......General
5410-5414......Translations
5420-5460......Special periods
5470-5488......Poetry
5490-5515......Drama
5517-5547......Prose
5555-5881.36....Individual authors or works
5555-5595......Medieval
5600-5739......16th-18th centuries
5620-5637.....Jacob Cats
5700-5732.....Joost van den Vondel
5800-5880......1800-1960
5881-5881.36...1961-2000
5882-5882.36...2001-
5901-5980.......Provincial, local, foreign
6000-6466.36.....Flemish literature since 1830
6000-6199.......Literary history and criticism
(6200)-(6230)...Folk literature
6250............Juvenile literature (General)
6300-6397.......Collections
6400-6466.36....Individual authors or works
6500-6592.36.....Afrikaans literature
6500-6530.......Literary history and criticism
(6540)-6545.....Folk literature
6550-6575.......Collections
6580............Local
6590-6592.36....Individual authors or works
7001-7099........Scandinavian literature
7001-7099.......General
7001-7087......Literary history and criticism
(7088)-(7089)...Folk literature
7090-7099......Collections
7101-7338........Old Norse literature: Old Icelandic and Old Norwegian
7101-7211.......Literary history and criticism
7170-7176......Poetry
7177-7211......Prose
7181-7193.....Sagas
7195-7211.....Scientific and learned literature
7220-7262.5.....Collections
7230-7252......Poetry
7255-7262.5....Prose
7261-7262.5...Sagas
7263-7296.......Individual sagas and historical works
7298-7309.......Religious works
7312-7318.......Scientific and learned literature
7326-7338.......Individual authors or works before 1540
7351-7550........Modern Icelandic literature
7351-7418.......Literary history and criticism
(7420)-(7438)...Folk literature
7442............Juvenile literature (General)
7450-7495.......Collections
7500-7511.......Individual authors or works
7500-7501......16th-18th centuries
7510-7511......19th-20th centuries
7512-7513......21st century
7520-7550.......Provincial, local, foreign
7581-7599........Faroese literature
7581-7592.......Literary history and criticism
7593-7596.5.....Collections
7597............Local
7598-7599.......Individual authors or works
7601-8260........Danish literature
7601-7869.......Literary history and criticism
7721-7762......Special periods
7770-7794......Poetry
7800-7832......Drama
7835-7869......Prose
(7900)-7930.....Folk literature
7935............Juvenile literature (General)
7945-8046.......Collections
7975-7994......Poetry
7999-8020......Drama
8021-8046......Prose
8050-8176.36....Individual authors or works
8050...........Medieval
8060-8098.....16th-18th centuries
8070-8094.5...Ludvig Holberg
8100-8167.....19th century
8102-8120....Hans Christian Andersen
8145-8157....Adam Gottlob Oehlenschläger
8174-8175.....1900-1960
8176-8176.36...1961-2000
8177-8177.36...2001-
8205-8260......Provincial, local, foreign
8301-9155.......Norwegian literature
8301-8574......Literary history and criticism
(8420)-8456...Special periods
8460-8489.....Poetry
8500-8534.....Drama
8540-8574.....Prose
(8600)-(8637)...Folk literature
8640...........Juvenile literature (General)
8650-8733......Collections
8675-8695.....Poetry
8699-8718.....Drama
8719-8723.....Prose
8750-8951.36...Individual authors or works
8750-8775.....16th-18th centuries
8800-8942.....19th century
8851-8900....Henrik Ibsen
8949-8950.....1900-1960
8951-8951.36...1961-2000
8952-8952.36...2001-
9000-9094......Landsmaal or New Norwegian
9000-9019.....Literary history and criticism
9025-9055.....Collections
9064-9094.....Individual authors
9100-9155......Provincial, local, foreign
9201-9999.......Swedish literature
9201-9499......Literary history and criticism
9320-9370.....Special periods
9375-9404.....Poetry
9415-9449.....Drama
9460-9499.....Prose
(9509)-(9542)...Folk literature
9544...........Juvenile literature (General)
9547-9639......Collections
9565-9570.....Translations
9580-9599.....Poetry
9605-9625.....Drama
9626-9639.....Prose
9650-9876.36...Individual authors or works
9650-9651.....Medieval
9674-9715.....16th-18th centuries
9725-9850.....19th century
9759-9771....Selma Lagerlöf
9800-9817....Johan August Strindberg
9820-9838....Esaias Tegnér
9870-9875.....1900-1960
9876-9876.36...1961-2000
9877-9877.36...2001-
9950-9999......Provincial, local, foreign

PZ - Fiction and juvenile belles letters

1-90....Fiction and juvenile belles lettres
1-4....Fiction in English
5-90...Juvenile belles letters

References

Further reading 
 Full schedule of all LCC Classifications
 List of all LCC Classification Outlines

P